James Patrick (born June 7, 1982 in Tuskegee, Alabama) is a professional Canadian football safety who is currently a free-agent. He was most recently a member of the Hamilton Tiger-Cats of the Canadian Football League. He was originally signed by the Tampa Bay Buccaneers as an undrafted free agent in 2006 and also spent time on the practice squad of the New England Patriots. He played college football at Stillman College.

Professional career

Saskatchewan Roughriders
Patrick spent five seasons with the Saskatchewan Roughriders after signing as a free agent in 2008. He was an all-star in 2010, when he recorded 68 tackles, nine interceptions and a touchdown. Unfortunately, In 2012, he had his worst statistical year since his rookie season, registering 40 tackles and no interceptions. As a result, it was his final season with the Riders as he was released in the off-season.

Hamilton Tiger-Cats
Through the first 4 games of the 2013 CFL season Patrick recorded 12 tackles and 4 special teams tackles, and was released following a Week 4 blowout.  In his career, he has 239 defensive tackles, 18 interceptions and two sacks as of July 24, 2013.

Personal life
James is married to Tiffany Patrick. They have one daughter, who is 14, and a 4 year old son.
 His brother, Qua Cox, also plays football at Jackson State University 2009-2013. He was signed as an undrafted free agent to the Colts in the NFL in 2014.

References

1982 births
Living people
American football cornerbacks
New England Patriots players
Sportspeople from Tuskegee, Alabama